Bauk may refer to:

 Bauk (field), a Scottish word for a strip of a corn field left fallow
 Bauk (mythology), a mythical creature in Serbian mythology
 Adrian Bauk (born 1985), a former Australian basketball player
 Arsen Bauk, (born 1973), a Croatian politician
 Braille Authority of the United Kingdom (BAUK)